"Talkin' bout My Baby" (or "Talking 'bout My Baby") is a song by English big beat musician Fatboy Slim, released in 2002 as a single from his third studio album Halfway Between the Gutter and the Stars. The 12" single released for the song contained a remix of "Drop the Hate" as its b-side. Upon its release, it peaked at No. 92 on the UK Singles Chart. The vocal samples are taken from the Wet Willie recording "Macon Hambone Blues". The piano sample is Erik Satie's Gymnopédies.

Track listing 

 "Talkin' bout My Baby" (Midfield General's Disco re-shuffle mix)
 "Drop the Hate" (remix)

Charts 

2002 singles
Fatboy Slim songs
Songs written by Norman Cook
Trip hop songs
2000 songs